African Independence Party (in French: Parti Africain de l'Indépendance) was a communist party in French West Africa (AOF). PAI was founded in Thiès, Senegal in 1957. Later as AOF was dissolved into independent countries the local PAI sections became independent parties, often keeping the name PAI.

PAI was the first party in AOF to unequivocally demand independence from French rule.

In Senegal PAI was banned on August 1, 1960.

In Senegal the following parties trace/traced their origin back to PAI:
 Party of Independence and Work (PIT, technically the original PAI)
 African Independence Party-Renewal (legally registered as PAI)
 Democratic League - Movement for the Labour Party
 Senegalese Communist Party (short-lived pro-Chinese faction)

In Upper Volta/Burkina Faso PAI was established in 1963. PAI attained importance through its mass front Patriotic League for Development (LIPAD). Today LIPAD is dissolved, and PAI has split in two factions:
 African Independence Party (Ouédraogo). Technically the original PAI
 African Independence Party (Touré), legally recognized as PAI

List of founders of PAI
 Madame Basse
 M. Basse
 Coupet Camara
 Seydou Cissokho
 Adama Diagne
 Oumar Diallo
 Birahim Diawara Birahim
 Majhemout Diop
 Bouna Fall
 Abdou Ka
 Alioune Kamara
 Malick Kamara
 Basile Khaly
 Tidiane Baïdy Ly
 Abdou Moumouni
 Abdoulaye Ndiaye
 Samba Ndiaye
 Samba
 Khalilou Sall
 Ousmane Santara
 Bacirou Sarr
 Moussé Guèye Seck
 Sékou Touré

References

1957 establishments in French West Africa
African and Black nationalist parties in Africa
Communist parties in Africa
Pan-African organizations
Political parties established in 1957
Political parties in French West Africa
Political parties with year of disestablishment missing
Transnational political parties